Edward Thomas O'Meara (August 3, 1921 – January 10, 1992) was an American prelate of the Roman Catholic Church. He served as archbishop of the Archdiocese of Indianapolis in Indiana from 1980 until 1992.  He previously served as an auxiliary bishop of the Archdiocese of St. Louis in Missouri from 1972 to 1980.

Biography
The son of Irish immigrants, Edward O'Meara was born on August 3, 1921, in St. Louis, Missouri. He attended Kenrick Seminary in St. Louis before being ordained a priest for the Archdiocese of St. Louis by Archbishop Joseph Ritter on December 21, 1946. He then furthered his studies in Rome, where he earned a Doctor of Theology degree from the Pontifical University of St. Thomas Acquinas in 1952. He became national director of the Society for the Propagation of the Faith on December 28, 1966.

On January 28, 1972, O'Meara was appointed as an auxiliary bishop of the Archdiocese of St. Louis and titular bishop of Thisiduo by Pope Paul VI. He received his episcopal consecration on February 13, 1971, from Paul VI himself in St. Peter's Basilica, with Cardinals Bernard Alfrink and William Conway serving as co-consecrators.

On November 27, 1979, O'Meara was appointed the fourth archbishop of the Archdiocese of Indianapolis by Pope John Paul II, succeeding Archbishop George Biskup.  He was installed on January 10, 1980.

O'Meara served as chair of Catholic Relief Services from 1987 to 1991, when he was diagnosed with pulmonary fibrosis.

O'Meara died in Indianapolis at age 70 on January 10, 1992, at his residence in Indianapolis.  He is buried in Calvary Chapel Mausoleum in Indianapolis. The Archbishop Edward T. O'Meara Catholic Center in Indianapolis was named after O'Meara.

References

External links
Archdiocese of Indianapolis
New York Times' obituary

1921 births
1992 deaths
Clergy from St. Louis
20th-century Roman Catholic archbishops in the United States
Roman Catholic Archdiocese of St. Louis
Roman Catholic archbishops of Indianapolis
Religious leaders from Missouri
American clergy of Irish descent
20th-century Roman Catholic bishops in the United States
People from St. Louis
Catholics from Missouri